Karan Kundrra (born 11 October 1984) is an Indian actor who is known for his work in Hindi films and television.
He made his acting debut with Ekta Kapoor's popular television show Kitani Mohabbat Hai. He then starred in several TV shows like  Kitani Mohabbat Hai 2, Yeh Kahan Aa Gaye Hum, Dil Hi Toh Hai and Yeh Rishta Kya Kehlata Hai and hosted reality shows like MTV Roadies, MTV Love School and Dance Deewane Juniors. Kundra has also featured in films like Mubarakan and 1921. In 2021, he participated in the reality show Bigg Boss 15 and emerged as the 2nd runner-up.

Career
Kundrra made his acting debut in 2009 with the lead role of Arjun Punj in Kitani Mohabbat Hai on NDTV Imagine. In late 2009, he went on to play the lead character of Veeru in Bayttaab Dil Kee Tamanna Hai on Sony TV. After appearing in an episodic role as a ghost Prince in Aahat on Sony TV, he went on to participate in the dance reality show Zara Nachke Dikha on Star Plus in May 2010. Later on, he played the lead role of Arjun Singhania in Kitani Mohabbat Hai on Imagine TV. He was then seen as a host in the first two seasons of Gumrah – End Of Innocence on Channel V. He played the role of Karan Kapoor in Teri Meri Love Stories on Star Plus. Kundrra was next seen in V The Serial on Channel V in 2012. He was also seen as a gangleader in the reality show Roadies on MTV. He also hosted another reality show Love School on MTV for 3 seasons.

In 2017, he was cast as Manpreet Sandhu in Anees Bazmee's film Mubarakan alongside Arjun Kapoor and Ileana D'Cruz. In 2018, he starred as the lead Ayush Asthana in Vikram Bhatt's horror film 1921. The same year, he made a comeback to television with Ekta Kapoor's romantic drama Dil Hi Toh Hai, which extended for two more seasons on the OTT platform ALTBalaji and mx player 2019 and 2020.

In 2020 Kundrra appeared in ALT balaji web series It happened in Calcutta where he portrayed the lead character of Ronobir Chatterjee. In April 2021, he played the role of Ranveer Chauhan in Yeh Rishta Kya Kehlata Hai. In October 2021, Kundrra participated in the popular reality show Bigg Boss 15 and emerged as the second runner-up. In March 2022, he was seen as a jailor on the reality show LockUpp which streamed on ALTBalaji and MX Player. In April 2022, Kundrra hosted the dance reality show Dance Deewane Juniors 1 on Colors TV.

In 2023, he will be seen in Colors TV’s upcoming series Tere Ishq Mein Ghayal as Veer.

Personal life

The actor is currently dating actress Tejasswi Prakash. The two met inside the Bigg Boss 15 house and eventually started dating after that.

In the media
Kundrra ranked at 84th and 92nd position on the Forbes India list for top 100 celebrities in 2018 and 2019 respectively.

He was 'Guest of Honour' at Asia’s largest youth conference held in 2013.
He was awarded the ‘Outstanding Talent of the Year’ at Filmfare Middle East 2022 held in Dubai.

Filmography

Films

Television

Special appearances

Music videos

Web series

See also

 List of Bollywood actors
 List of Indian television actors

References

External links

Living people
Place of birth missing (living people)
Indian male models
Indian male television actors
Indian television presenters
Punjabi people
Male actors from Punjab, India
Male actors in Punjabi cinema
1984 births
Bigg Boss (Hindi TV series) contestants